Tasmanite is a sedimentary rock type almost entirely consisting of the prasinophyte alga Tasmanites. It is commonly associated with high-latitude, nutrient-rich, marginal marine settings find in Tasmania.  It is classified as marine type oil shale. It is found in many oil-prone source rocks and, when present, contributes to the oil generation potential of the rock. Some sources also produce a red-brown translucent material similar to amber which has also been called tasmanite.

See also
Cannel coal
Kukersite
Lamosite
Marinite
Torbanite
Oil shale geology

References

Oil shale geology
Oil shale in Australia